The Daniel Robert House is a historic house located at 25 West End Avenue in Somerville in Somerset County, New Jersey. The house was built in 1888 for Daniel Robert (1840–1908) by the architectural firm Lambert & Bunnell based on Gothic revival style houses designed by the architect Alexander Jackson Davis. It now serves as the Somerville Borough Hall and the Somerville Public Library. The building was added to the National Register of Historic Places on March 5, 2008 for its significance in architecture from 1888 to 1939.

References

Historic Advisory Committee Somerville Borough (2020). The County's Handsomest House: The Story of an American Gothic Classic. Kindle Direct.

External links
 
 

	
Somerville, New Jersey
Houses in Somerset County, New Jersey
National Register of Historic Places in Somerset County, New Jersey
New Jersey Register of Historic Places
Gothic Revival architecture in New Jersey
Houses completed in 1888